James Barclay Dempster (30 January 1896 – 1957) was a Scottish professional footballer who played as a goalkeeper for Sunderland.

References

1896 births
1957 deaths
People from Newarthill
Scottish footballers
Association football goalkeepers
Sunderland A.F.C. players
Airdrieonians F.C. players
St Johnstone F.C. players
Dundee United F.C. players
Bo'ness F.C. players
Bathgate F.C. players
English Football League players
Footballers from North Lanarkshire